Mor Osthatheos Issac (born 17 January 1976) is a Syriac Orthodox bishop, currently Metropolitan of Bangalore, Mylapore Diocese in Tamil Nadu and Patriarchal Vicar of U.A.E.

Education
Issac completed primary and secondary school education from Georgian Academy English Medium School, Thiruvankulam and high school from Rajarshi Memorial Higher Secondary School, Vadavucode. He attained graduation in Economics from St. Albert's College and Post-graduation from Kerala University. He also graduated in Library Science from Indira Gandhi National Open University, New Delhi.

References

Syriac Orthodox Church bishops
Indian Oriental Orthodox Christians
Christian clergy from Kottayam
1976 births
Living people
University of Kerala alumni
Indira Gandhi National Open University alumni